The 1976 United States Senate election in Missouri took place on November 2, 1976. Incumbent Democratic U.S. Senator Stuart Symington decided to retire, instead of seeking a fifth term. Republican John Danforth won the open seat, defeating Democrat Warren Hearnes. (Jerry Litton had won the Democratic nomination earlier, but died in a plane crash on the night of the primary election, and Hearnes was chosen by the party committee.)

Democratic primary

Candidates
Warren Hearnes, former Governor of Missouri
 Horace Kingery
Jerry Litton, U.S. Representative from Chilicothe
 Terry Richards
 Lee Sutton, former State Representative
James W. Symington, U.S. Representative from Ladue and son of incumbent Senator Stuart Symington
 William McKinley Thomas, perennial candidate
 Norman L. Tucker
 Jim C. Tyler
Charles Wheeler, Mayor of Kansas City

Results

On primary night, Representative Litton and his entire family died in a plane crash en route to his victory party. To replace Litton on the general election ticket, the Missouri Democratic State Committee held a meeting and elected runner-up Warren Hearnes as the party's nominee. He was chosen over State Treasurer of Missouri Jim Spainhower.

Republican primary

Candidates
John Danforth, Attorney General of Missouri and nominee for Senate in 1970
 Gregory Hansman, candidate for Lt. Governor in 1972 and Senate in 1974

Results

Independents and third parties

Independent
 Lawrence "Red" Petty, unsuccessful candidate for the American Party nomination for Senate in 1970

General election

Results

See also 
 1976 United States Senate elections

References

Missouri
1976
1976 Missouri elections